Kučín may refer to several places in Slovakia notably in the Prešov Region.

Kučín, Bardejov District
Kučín, Vranov nad Topľou District